Denise Tantucci (born 14 March 1997) is an Italian actress.

Early life and career 
Denise was born in Fano to an Italian father and a German mother. She began her career playing the part of Giusy in the fifth season of Provaci ancora prof! and the part of Daphne in the ninth season of Don Matteo. In 2013, she played the character of Giada Spanoi, an Albanian girl looking for her parents who emigrated some time before her, in the ninth season of Un medico in famiglia. It was this series that  brought her popularity.

In 2014, she wrote and produced her first show, Un doppio legame, which was staged in September. In the same year, she joined the cast of the second season of Braccialetti rossi and the third of Fuoriclasse. Also, in September, she shot the film Ma tu di che segno 6?, directed by Neri Parenti, in cinemas from 11 December 2014.

In 2015, she continued her cinematographic experience, joining the cast of the international film Ben-Hur, a remake of the famous Ben-Hur by William Wyler. In the same year, she returned to the set for the filming of the third season of Braccialetti rossi, during which she participated with her colleagues in the spot against youth discrimination.

Filmography

Films

Television

Music videos

References

External links

1997 births
Living people
Italian film actresses
People from Fano
Italian stage actresses
Italian television actresses
Italian people of German descent
21st-century Italian actresses